Károly Bazini (18 February 1910 – 1 March 1973) was a Hungarian rower. He competed in the men's double sculls event at the 1936 Summer Olympics.

References

1910 births
1973 deaths
Hungarian male rowers
Olympic rowers of Hungary
Rowers at the 1936 Summer Olympics
Rowers from Budapest